ANPP may refer to:

 4-anilino-N-phenethylpiperidine – a direct precursor to fentanyl
 All Nigeria Peoples Party
 Armenian Nuclear Power Plant
 The Army Nuclear Power Program, a program to develop small nuclear power plants
 Aboveground Net Primary Production- (Grasslands) amount of aboveground plant biomass or carbon accumulated over a specific time period.